Elephant Jason is one of the Jason Islands in the north west Falkland Islands. In Spanish, it is considered one of the "Islas las Llaves" (eastern, Seal Rocks and North Fur Island); such a distinction does not exist in English between the two groups of the islands. It is named for the southern elephant seals.

References

Jason Islands